Ghost Stories of an Antiquary is a horror short story collection by British writer M. R. James, published in 1904 (some had previously appeared in magazines). Some later editions under this title contain both the original collection and its successor, More Ghost Stories (1911), combined in one volume.

It was his first short story collection.

Contents of the original edition 
 "Canon Alberic's Scrap-Book"
 "Lost Hearts"
 "The Mezzotint"
 "The Ash-tree"
 "Number 13"
 "Count Magnus"
 'Oh, Whistle, and I'll Come to You, My Lad'
 "The Treasure of Abbot Thomas"

Reception
A. M. Burrage praised Ghost Stories of an Antiquary and its successor, More Ghost Stories of an Antiquary as "two really admirable books of ghost stories". Burrage also described  'Oh, Whistle, and I'll Come to You, My Lad' as "a real gem".

Adaptations
After Jonathan Miller adapted Oh, Whistle, and I'll Come to You, My Lad for the BBC's Omnibus series in 1968, several stories from the collection were adapted as the BBC's yearly Ghost Story for Christmas strand, including "Lost Hearts", "The Treasure of Abbot Thomas", "The Ash-tree", and "Number 13". "Whistle and I'll Come to You" was also remade (heavily adapted by Neil Cross) for broadcast on Christmas Eve 2010. Mark Gatiss wrote and directed adaptations of "The Mezzotint" and "Count Magnus" for the Ghost Story for Christmas series in 2021 and 2022 respectively.

References

External links 

 
 
  (Part 2)
 

1904 short story collections
Short story collections by M. R. James
Ghosts in written fiction
Ghost stories
Horror short story collections